The Owl of Minerva is a peer-reviewed academic journal focusing on the work and legacy of Georg Wilhelm Friedrich Hegel. Since 1969 it has published approximately 1,000 articles, reviews, discussions, and English translations of scholarly work on Hegel's thought. Notable scholars who have contributed to the journal include William Desmond, Louis Dupre, Dieter Henrich, Quentin Lauer, T. M. Knox, John Sallis, and Hans-Martin Sass. The Owl of Minerva is the official journal of the Hegel Society of America and members receive the current volume as a benefit of membership. All issues are available online from the Philosophy Documentation Center.

Indexing
The Owl of Minerva is indexed in Academic Search, ArticleFirst, Current Abstracts, Expanded Academic ASAP, Index Philosophicus, InfoTrac OneFile, International Bibliography of Periodical Literature (IBZ), International Philosophical Bibliography, MLA International Bibliography, Periodicals Index Online, The Philosopher's Index, Philosophy Research Index, PhilPapers, and TOC Premier.

See also 
 List of philosophy journals

External links 
 
 Hegel Society of America

English-language journals
Biannual journals
Publications established in 1969
Georg Wilhelm Friedrich Hegel
Philosophy Documentation Center academic journals
Journals about philosophers
Owls in culture